Guillermo Torres (born 16 December 1937) is a Mexican basketball player. He competed in the men's tournament at the 1960 Summer Olympics.

References

External links
 

1937 births
Living people
Mexican men's basketball players
1963 FIBA World Championship players
Olympic basketball players of Mexico
Basketball players at the 1960 Summer Olympics
People from Chihuahua City
Basketball players from Chihuahua